Diamond FM may refer to:

 Diamond FM (Nigeria) (101.1 FM), a radio station in Ibadan, Nigeria
 Diamond FM (Zimbabwe) (103.8 FM), a radio station in Mutare, Zimbabwe